DePue is a village in Bureau County, Illinois, United States. The population was 1,633 at the 2020 census. It is part of the Ottawa Micropolitan Statistical Area.

History
DePue, originally called Trenton, was laid out in 1853. The present name refers to an early French fur trader by the name of De Pue. The site had long been used as a port and ice harvesting center on the Illinois River. In 1905, the Mineral Point Zinc Company started a plant to produce slab zinc for automobile and appliances in DePue, taking advantage of the nearby coalfields and trained labor force of the LaSalle-Peru zinc processing center. The plant was shortly after acquired by New Jersey Zinc and finally closed in 1990.

Geography
DePue is located at  (41.326112, -89.301184).

Demographics

According to the 2010 census, DePue had a population of 1,838.  The people identified their race as being 41.7% non-Hispanic white, 0.4% non-Hispanic black, 0.6% Hispanic black, 0.8% Native American, 1.8% Asian and 26.0% from some other race.  54.7% of the population was Hispanic or Latino of any race, with 49.8% of the population saying they were Mexican by ethnicity.

As of the census of 2000, there were 1,842 people, 658 households, and 452 families residing in the village. The racial makeup of the village was 42.36% White, 0.11% African American, 0.49% Native American, 2.06% Asian, 0.11% Pacific Islander, 11.51% from other races, and 3.37% from two or more races. Hispanic or Latino of any race were 45.77% of the population.

There were 658 households, out of which 33.6% had children under the age of 18 living with them, 52.4% were married couples living together, 11.4% had a female householder with no husband present, and 31.2% were non-families. 27.5% of all households were made up of individuals, and 16.7% had someone living alone who was 65 years of age or older.  The average household size was 2.78 and the average family size was 3.42.

In the village, the population was spread out, with 29.0% under the age of 18, 9.5% from 18 to 24, 25.6% from 25 to 44, 18.5% from 45 to 64, and 17.3% who were 65 years of age or older.  The median age was 34 years. For every 100 females, there were 109.3 males.  For every 100 females age 18 and over, there were 98.6 males.

The median income for a household in the village was $32,500, and the median income for a family was $36,985. Males had a median income of $26,094 versus $19,643 for females. The per capita income for the village was $15,273.  About 12.3% of families and 13.1% of the population were below the poverty line, including 17.5% of those under age 18 and 6.8% of those age 65 or over.

Lake DePue
The lake and adjacent park feature wildlife and recreation. The American Power Boat Association (APBA) and the DePue Men's Club (a social and volunteer organization) host a weekend of boat racing on Lake DePue. The event draws spectators from across the country and brings entertainment and food vendors to the lakeside park. Barack Obama visited when he was an Illinois legislator. In a January 16, 2011, news story featured in the online edition of the Peoria Journal Star, Associated Press reporter Tammy Webber reported that the oxbow lake, surrounded by a Superfund site, is polluted by high levels of metals such as zinc, lead, arsenic, cadmium, and chromium because of smelting activity there for the automotive and appliance industries, chiefly by New Jersey Zinc and Mobil Chemical. The village is urging Illinois Attorney General Lisa Madigan to investigate whether the Illinois Environmental Protection Agency, which has oversight over the case, is pushing the companies hard enough. This is important because the town alleges the companies and the IEPA have not done enough to combat the pollution, that has made the lake markedly shallower. This phenomenon could, unless rapidly remedied (perhaps by the temporary fix of dredging, which the IEPA cannot legally order in this case), soon interfere with the small municipality's efforts to keep its remaining revenue source for most supplemental projects, the competition. The manufacturing jobs have entirely disappeared.

In the summer of 2012, as a result of both the summer's drought and Lake DePue's pollution, the APBA nearly cancelled its National Championship Races due to shallow water. In a display of community and hard work, DePue's citizens built a dam at the mouth of the lake and raised the water, by pumps and the lake's springs, to racing level in a matter of weeks.

Education
One school building hosts all three village schools, the elementary, the junior high, and DePue High School. The three schools have classes in different wings of the building. The name of the school district is DePue Unit Schools District #103. Extracurricular activities offered for the grade 6-12 students include sports and clubs. DePue Junior High School offers boys and girls basketball, girls' volleyball, cheerleading, and track. DePue High School offers boys and girls basketball, soccer, girls' volleyball, cheerleading, and track. Extracurricular activities for the junior high school include Art Club, Student Council, Spelling Bee, Video Game Club, and Chess Club. High school activities include Student Council, National Honor Society, and the Activity Club. Annual activities that many clubs sponsor include JH Movie Nights, HS Homecoming and dances, as well as class trips throughout the year.

References

External links
Village of DePue official website
New Jersey Zinc / Mobil Chemical community fact sheet, Illinois EPA, August 2012
History of DePue Illinois, 1976
A Plan to Clean Up DePue: Academia Meets Advocacy

Villages in Bureau County, Illinois
Villages in Illinois
Ottawa, IL Micropolitan Statistical Area
1853 establishments in Illinois